In mathematics, Abel's summation formula, introduced by Niels Henrik Abel, is intensively used in analytic number theory and the study of special functions to compute series.

Formula

Let  be a sequence of real or complex numbers.  Define the partial sum function  by

for any real number . Then:

Variations
Taking the left endpoint to be  gives the formula

The previous formula becomes

The resulting formulas are

These equations hold whenever both limits on the right-hand side exist and are finite.

A particularly useful case is the sequence  for all .  In this case, .  For this sequence, Abel's summation formula simplifies to

assuming that both terms on the right-hand side exist and are finite.

Abel's summation formula can be generalized to the case where  is only assumed to be continuous if the integral is interpreted as a Riemann–Stieltjes integral:

By taking  to be the partial sum function associated to some sequence, this leads to the summation by parts formula.

Examples

Harmonic numbers

The left-hand side is the harmonic number .

Representation of Riemann's zeta function
Fix a complex number .

If , then the limit as  exists and yields the formula

Reciprocal of Riemann zeta function
The technique of the previous example may also be applied to other Dirichlet series.

See also
Summation by parts
Integration by parts

References
 .
Number theory
Summability methods